Cyrus H. Harris (August 22, 1817 – January 6, 1888), a mixed-blood Chickasaw born in Mississippi, was elected the first Governor of the Chickasaw Nation, and served five non-consecutive two-year terms. Although his formal schooling was limited at an elementary level, he became fluent in both the English and Chickasaw languages. He and his family relocated to Indian Territory in 1837, where he was employed in business and also served as an interpreter and developed a keen interest in Chickasaw politics. In 1856, he was elected to his first term as governor of the newly established Chickasaw Nation His accomplishments included organizing a national government after the Chickasaw Nation and Choctaw Nation formally separated into two distinct entities. He also executed a formal alliance between his nation and  the Confederate States of America after the outbreak of the American Civil War. After the cessation of hostilities, he played a major role in the recovery of the nation from its devastated condition. He retired from politics in 1874, after serving his fifth term as governor. He died in 1887 at his home in Mill Valley, and was buried at the cemetery in Mill Valley.

Early life
Cyrus Harris was born August 22, 1817, to Elizabeth Oxbury  and a man named Harris or Harrison. near Pontotoc, Mississippi, on the estate of his grandmother, Molly Colbert Gunn. He began his formal education at Monroe Mission School in 1827. Later, he went to an Indian School in Giles County, Tennessee.  His formal schooling was only elementary, and he never returned to school after leaving Tennessee.

Cyrus' grandfather, General William Colbert, was a notable Chickasaw warrior and leader. In 1830, Cyrus returned to live with his grandmother, mother and uncle, Martin Colbert.

Relocation to Indian Territory
Early in the 19th Century, the Federal Government began its attempts to force Native Americans out of their homelands in the Southeastern United States to a sparsely settled area that they had reserved for them across the Mississippi River. It was officially known as Indian Territory. In 1818, the Chickasaws became the first of the Five Civilized Tribes to sell their lands in Kentucky and Tennessee to the government. Each received a twenty-year annuity of $1,000 for their share of the tribal land.
 
By 1830, the Federal Government was putting heavy pressure on the Chickasaws to move from their homes in other Southeastern states to  Indian Territory.  Their close relatives, the Choctaws, had already signed the 1830 Treaty of Dancing Rabbit Creek to move from Mississippi.  

Fluent in both English and Chickasaw, Cyrus Harris became useful as an interpreter in the many meetings with government officials to discuss details of the removal. Cyrus, himself, moved in November, 1837, and settled along the Blue River in what is now Johnston County, Oklahoma, where he opened a mercantile business.

Chickasaw Nation political life
Cyrus Harris' diplomatic experience before and during removal sparked his interest in Chickasaw political affairs. He was selected to accompany Edward Pickens in 1850 and 1854 on missions to meet with Federal officials about tribal business. When he returned from the 1850 mission to Washington, he sold his Blue River home, and moved to Boggy Creek, where he lived for about a year. In 1855, after returning from his 1854 journey to Washington, Harris moved to Mill Creek, Oklahoma, which remained his home for the rest of his life.

The Chickasaw Nation adopted a new constitution in August, 1856. According to Meserve, there were several candidates in the 1856 election for governor, but none received a majority of the popular vote. Thus, the choice was left to the  Legislature, which selected Cyrus Harris by a majority of one vote. Harris spent the majority of his two-year term organizing the new government. He ran for a second term in 1858, but was defeated by Dougherty Colbert.

Cyrus Harris was elected Governor again in 1860. During this term, the American Civil War broke out. The Chickasaws were the first of the Five Civilized Tribes to openly favor the Confederacy. Governor Harris signed the resolutions supporting secessions from the Union on May 25, 1861.

Harris lost the 1862 election to Dougherty Colbert, and did not run for office in 1864. He ran again in 1866 and was elected Governor for the third time, and was reelected in 1868. Apparently he did not run again in 1870, but made his final campaign in 1872, in which he won his final term as governor. Although he ran again in 1874, he lost to B. F. Overton. He was a candidate in the 1878 election for a sixth term,  but lost to Benjamin C. Burney by five votes. He then retired from politics and spent the remainder of his life at his Mill Creek home. He only emerged from political retirement in 1886 to vigorously support his nephew, William Guy, who was the Progressive Party candidate for governor. Guy's opponent, the "Conservative Party candidate, William L. Byrd, lost this election. However, their political fortunes reversed, and Byrd defeated Guy in the 1890 election.

Harris family
Sources state that Cyrus Harris married three times. His first wife was Kizzie Kemp. His second wife was Nancy Thomas who was born in 1830 in Chickasaw, Mississippi. She married Cyrus Harris in 1848. They had eight children in 14 years. She died as a young mother on January 22, 1864, in Mill Creek, Oklahoma, at the age of 34. His third was Hettie Frazier.

In 1960, flooding along Mill Creek threatened to wash away the old Mill Creek Cemetery. Relatives of Governor Harris decided to have his remains moved to the Drake-Nebo Cemetery.  His wife and one daughter, Emily, had been buried there during the 1990s. Their other daughter, Lucy Harris Lael, had been reburied in Oaklawn Cemetery in Wynnewood, Oklahoma.

Notes

References 

1817 births
1888 deaths
19th-century Native Americans
Governors of the Chickasaw Nation
People from Pontotoc, Mississippi
Pre-statehood history of Oklahoma